Mordecai Richler  (January 27, 1931 – July 3, 2001) was a Canadian writer. His best known works are The Apprenticeship of Duddy Kravitz (1959) and Barney's Version (1997). His 1970 novel St. Urbain's Horseman and 1989 novel Solomon Gursky Was Here were nominated for the Booker Prize. He is also well known for the Jacob Two-Two fantasy series for children. In addition to his fiction, Richler wrote numerous essays about the Jewish community in Canada, and about Canadian and Quebec nationalism. Richler's Oh Canada! Oh Quebec! (1992), a collection of essays about nationalism and anti-Semitism, generated considerable controversy.

Biography

Early life and education
The son of Lily (née Rosenberg) and Moses Isaac Richler, a scrap metal dealer, Richler was born on January 27, 1931, in Montreal, Quebec, and raised on St. Urbain Street in that city's Mile End area. He learned English, French and Yiddish, and graduated from Baron Byng High School. Richler enrolled in Sir George Williams College (now Concordia University) to study but did not complete his degree. Years later, Richler's mother published an autobiography, The Errand Runner: Memoirs of a Rabbi's Daughter (1981), which discusses Mordecai's birth and upbringing, and the sometimes difficult relationship between them. (Mordecai Richler's grandfather and Lily Richler's father was Rabbi Yehudah Yudel Rosenberg, a celebrated rabbi in both Poland and Canada and a prolific author of many religious texts, as well as religious fiction and non-fiction works on science and history geared for religious communities.)

Richler moved to Paris at age nineteen, intent on following in the footsteps of a previous generation of literary exiles, the so-called Lost Generation of the 1920s, many of whom were from the United States.

Career
Richler returned to Montreal in 1952, working briefly at the Canadian Broadcasting Corporation, then moved to London in 1954. He published seven of his ten novels, as well as considerable journalism, while living in London.

Worrying "about being so long away from the roots of my discontent", Richler returned to Montreal in 1972. He wrote repeatedly about the Anglophone community of Montreal and especially about his former neighbourhood, portraying it in multiple novels.

Marriage and family
In England, in 1954, Richler married Catherine Boudreau, nine years his senior. On the eve of their wedding, he met and was smitten by Florence Mann (née Wood), then married to Richler's close friend, screenwriter Stanley Mann.

Some years later Richler and Mann both divorced their prior spouses and married each other, and Richler adopted her son Daniel. The couple had four other children together: Jacob, Noah, Martha and Emma. These events inspired his novel Barney's Version.

Richler died of cancer on July 3, 2001, in Montreal, aged 70.

He was also a second cousin of novelist Nancy Richler.

Journalism career
Throughout his career, Richler wrote journalistic commentary, and contributed to The Atlantic Monthly, Look, The New Yorker, The American Spectator, and other magazines. In his later years, Richler was a newspaper columnist for The National Post and Montreal's The Gazette. In the late 1980s and early 1990s, he authored a monthly book review for Gentlemen's Quarterly.

Richler was often critical of Quebec but of Canadian federalism as well. Another favourite Richler target was the government-subsidized Canadian literary movement of the 1970s and 1980s. Journalism constituted an important part of his career, bringing him income between novels and films.

The Apprenticeship of Duddy Kravitz

Richler published his fourth novel, The Apprenticeship of Duddy Kravitz, in 1959. The book featured a frequent Richler theme: Jewish life in the 1930s and 40s in the neighbourhood of Montreal east of Mount Royal Park on and about St. Urbain Street and Saint Laurent Boulevard (known colloquially as "The Main"). Richler wrote of the neighbourhood and its people, chronicling the hardships and disabilities they faced as a Jewish minority.

Following the publication of Duddy Kravitz, according to The Oxford Companion to Canadian Literature, Richler became "one of the foremost writers of his generation".

Reception

Many critics distinguished Richler the author from Richler the polemicist. Richler frequently said his goal was to be an honest witness to his time and place, and to write at least one book that would be read after his death. His work was championed by journalists Robert Fulford and Peter Gzowski, among others. Admirers praised Richler for daring to tell uncomfortable truths; Michael Posner's oral biography of Richler is titled The Last Honest Man (2004).

Critics cited his repeated themes, including incorporating elements of his journalism into later novels. Richler's ambivalent attitude toward Montreal's Jewish community was captured in Mordecai and Me (2003), a book by Joel Yanofsky.

The Apprenticeship of Duddy Kravitz has been performed on film and in several live theatre productions in Canada and the United States.

Controversy

Richler's most frequent conflicts were with members of the Quebec nationalist movement. In articles published between the late 1970s and the mid-1990s, Richler criticized Quebec's restrictive language laws and the rise of sovereigntism. Critics took particular exception to Richler's well-founded allegations of a long history of anti-Semitism in Quebec.

Soon after the first election of the Parti Québécois (PQ) in 1976, Richler published "Oh Canada! Lament for a divided country" in the Atlantic Monthly to considerable controversy. In it, he claimed the PQ had borrowed the Hitler Youth song "Tomorrow Belongs to Me" from Cabaret for their anthem "À partir d'aujourd'hui, demain nous appartient",<ref name="SRCLISEE">{{cite news |url=http://archives.cbc.ca/IDC-0-72-744-4553/arts_culture/mordecai_richler/clip5 |title=Video: Controverse autour du livre Oh Canada Oh Québec! |work=Archives |publisher=Société Radio-Canada |date=March 31, 1992 |access-date=September 22, 2006}}</ref> though he later acknowledged his error on the song, blaming himself for having "cribbed" the information from an article by Irwin Cotler and Ruth Wisse published in the American magazine, Commentary. Cotler eventually issued a written apology to Lévesque of the PQ. Richler also apologized for the incident and called it an "embarrassing gaffe".

In 1992 Richler published Oh Canada! Oh Quebec!: Requiem for a Divided Country, which parodied Quebec's language laws. He commented approvingly on Esther Delisle's The Traitor and the Jew: Anti-Semitism and the Delirium of Extremist Right-Wing Nationalism in French Canada from 1929–1939 (1992), about French-Canadian anti-Semitism in the decade before the start of World War II. Oh Canada! Oh Quebec! was criticized by the Quebec sovereigntist movement and to a lesser degree by other anglophone Canadians. His detractors claimed that Richler had an outdated and stereotyped view of Quebec society, and fearmongered that he risked polarizing relations between francophone and anglophone Quebecers. Sovereigntist Pierrette Venne, later elected as a Bloc Québécois MP, called for the book to be banned. Daniel Latouche compared the book to Mein Kampf.

Nadia Khouri believes that there was a discriminatory undertone in the reaction to Richler, noting that some of his critics characterized him as "not one of us" or that he was not a "real Quebecer". She found that some critics had misquoted his work; for instance, in reference to the mantra of the entwined church and state coaxing females to procreate as vastly as possible, a section in which he said that Quebec women were treated like "sows" was misinterpreted to suggest that Richler thought they were sows. Québécois writers who thought critics had overreacted included Jean-Hugues Roy, Étienne Gignac, Serge-Henri Vicière, and Dorval Brunelle. His defenders asserted that Mordecai Richler may have been wrong on certain specific points, but was certainly not racist nor anti-Québécois. Nadia Khouri acclaimed Richler for his courage and for attacking the orthodoxies of Quebec society. He has been described as "the most prominent defender of the rights of Quebec's anglophones".

Some commentators were alarmed about the strong controversy over Richler's book, saying that it underlines and acknowledges the persistence of anti-Semitism among sections of the Quebec population. Richler received death threats; an anti-Semitic Francophone journalist yelled at one of his sons, "[I]f your father was here, I'd make him relive the Holocaust right now!" An editorial cartoon in L'actualité compared him to Hitler. One critic controversially claimed that Richler had been paid by Jewish groups to write his critical essay on Quebec. His defenders believed this was evoking old stereotypes of Jews. When leaders of the Jewish community were asked to dissociate themselves from Richler, the journalist Frances Kraft said that indicated that they did not consider Richler as part of the Quebec "tribe" because he was Anglo-speaking and Jewish.

About the same time, Richler announced he had founded the "Impure Wool Society," to grant the Prix Parizeau to a distinguished non-Francophone writer of Quebec. The group's name plays on the expression Québécois pure laine, typically used to refer to Quebecker with extensive French-Canadian multi-generational ancestry (or "pure wool"). The prize (with an award of $3000) was granted twice: to Benet Davetian in 1996 for The Seventh Circle, and David Manicom in 1997 for Ice in Dark Water.

In 2010, Montreal city councillor Marvin Rotrand presented a 4,000-signature petition calling on the city to honour Richler on the 10th anniversary of his death with the renaming of a street, park or building in Richler's old Mile End neighbourhood. The council initially denied an honour to Richler, saying it would sacrifice the heritage of their neighbourhood. In response to the controversy, the City of Montreal announced it was to renovate and rename a gazebo in his honour. For various reasons, the project stalled for several years but was completed in 2016.

Representation in other media
 St. Urbain's Horseman (1971) was made into a CBC television drama.
 In 1973 The Apprenticeship of Duddy Kravitz was adapted into a film of the same name starring Richard Dreyfuss as Duddy.
 The Apprenticeship of Duddy Kravitz has repeatedly been adapted as a musical play, i.e. in 1984 (Edmonton, Alberta, Canada), 1987 (Philadelphia), and 2015 (Montreal).
 The animator Caroline Leaf created The Street (1976), based on Richler's 1969 short story of the same name. It was nominated for an Academy Award in animation.
 In 1978 Jacob Two-Two Meets the Hooded Fang was adapted into a theatrical film as Jacob Two-Two Meets the Hooded Fang (1978 film).
 In 1999 Jacob Two-Two Meets the Hooded Fang was adapted into a television film as Jacob Two Two Meets the Hooded Fang (1999 film).
 In 1985 Joshua Then and Now (1980) was adapted into a film of the same name.
 In 2003 Jacob Two-Two was adapted into an animated series of the same name loosely based on the titular character of the book series.
 In 2009 Barney's Version was adapted for radio by the CBC.
 In 2010 Barney's Version (1997) was adapted into a film of the same name.

Awards and recognition
 1969 Governor General's Award for Cocksure and Hunting Tigers Under Glass.
 1972 Governor General's Award for St. Urbain's Horseman.
 1975 Writers Guild of America Award for Best Comedy for screenplay of The Apprenticeship of Duddy Kravitz.
 1976 Canadian Library Association Book of the Year for Children Award: Jacob Two-Two Meets the Hooded Fang.
 1976 Ruth Schwartz Children's Book Award for Jacob Two-Two Meets the Hooded Fang.
 1990 Commonwealth Writers Prize for Solomon Gursky was Here 1995 Mr. Christie's Book Award (for the best English book age 8 to 11) for Jacob Two-Two's First Spy Case.
 1997 The Giller Prize for Barney's Version.
 1998 Canadian Booksellers Associations "Author of the Year" award.
 1998 Stephen Leacock Award for Humour for Barney's Version 1998 Commonwealth Writers Prize for Best Book (Canada & Caribbean region) for Barney's Version 1998 The QSPELL Award for Barney's Version.
 2000 Honorary Doctorate of Letters, McGill University, Montreal, Quebec.
 2000 Honorary Doctorate, Bishop's University, Lennoxville, Quebec.
 2001 Companion of the Order of Canada
 2004 Number 98 on the CBC's television show about great Canadians, The Greatest Canadian 2004 Barney's Version was chosen for inclusion in Canada Reads 2004, championed by author Zsuzsi Gartner.
 2006 Cocksure was chosen for inclusion in Canada Reads 2006, championed by actor and author Scott Thompson
 2011 Richler posthumously received a star on Canada's Walk of Fame and was inducted at the Elgin Theatre in Toronto.
 2011 In the same month he was inducted into Canada's Walk of Fame, the City of Montreal announced that a gazebo in Mount Royal Park would be refurbished and named in his honour. The structure overlooks Jeanne-Mance Park, where Richler played in his youth.
 2015 Richler was given his due as a "citizen of honour" in the city of Montreal. The Mile End Library, in the neighbourhood he portrayed in The Apprenticeship of Duddy Kravitz, was given his name.

Published works

Novels
 The Acrobats (1954) (also published as Wicked We Love, July 1955)
 Son of a Smaller Hero (1955)
 A Choice of Enemies (1957)
 The Apprenticeship of Duddy Kravitz (1959)
 The Incomparable Atuk (1963)
 Cocksure (1968)
 St. Urbain's Horseman (1971)
 Joshua Then and Now (1980)
 Solomon Gursky Was Here (1989)
 Barney's Version (1997)

Short story collection
 The Street (1969)

Fiction for children
Jacob Two-Two series
 Jacob Two-Two Meets the Hooded Fang (Alfred A. Knopf, 1975), illustrated by Fritz Wegner
 Jacob Two-Two and the Dinosaur (1987) 
 Jacob Two-Two's First Spy Case (1995)

Travel
 Images of Spain (1977)
 This Year in Jerusalem (1994)

Essays
 Hunting Tigers Under Glass: Essays and Reports (1968)
 Shovelling Trouble (1972)
 Notes on an Endangered Species and Others (1974)
 The Great Comic Book Heroes and Other Essays (1978)
 Home Sweet Home: My Canadian Album (1984)
 Broadsides (1991)
 Belling the Cat (1998)
 Oh Canada! Oh Quebec! Requiem for a Divided Country (1992)
 Dispatches from the Sporting Life (2002)

Nonfiction
 On Snooker: The Game and the Characters Who Play It (2001)

Anthologies
 Canadian Writing Today (1970)
 The Best of Modern Humour (1986) (U.S. title: The Best of Modern Humor)
 Writers on World War II (1991)

Film scripts
 Insomnia Is Good for You (1957) (co-written with Lewis Griefer )
   Dearth of a Salesman (1957, starring Peter Sellers   ) (co-written with Lewis Griefer   )
 No Love for Johnnie (1962) (co-written with Nicholas Phipps, based on the novel by Wilfred Fienburgh)
 Life at the Top (1965) (screenplay from novel by John Braine)
 The Apprenticeship of Duddy Kravitz (1974) (Screenwriters Guild Award and Oscar screenplay nomination)
 The Street (1976) (Oscar nomination)
 Fun with Dick and Jane (1977, with David Giler & Jerry Belson, from a story by Gerald Gaiser)
 The Wordsmith (1979)
 Joshua Then and Now (1985)
 Barney's Version (2010, screenplay by Michael Konyves, based on Richler's novel of the same name; Richler wrote an early draft)

See also

 List of Quebec authors
 Jews in Montreal

References

Further reading
 Charles Foran , Mordecai: The Life & Times (Toronto: Alfred A. Knopf Canada, 2010)
 Reinhold Kramer , Mordecai Richler: Leaving St Urbain (2008)
 Victor Teboul, Ph.D., "Mordecai Richler, le Québec et les Juifs", Tolerance website
 M. G. Vassanji, Extraordinary Canadians: Mordecai Richler'' (Penguin, 2009), biography

External links

 
 
 Yiddish phrases & cultural references in The Apprenticeship of Duddy Kravitz
 CBC Digital Archives: Mordecai Richler Was Here
 Obituary of Richler
 Literary biography of Richler
 Obituary by Robert Fulford
 
Walk in Montreal commemorating Mordecai Richler

 
1931 births
2001 deaths
People from Le Plateau-Mont-Royal
Canadian male novelists
Canadian fantasy writers
Jewish novelists
Jewish Canadian artists
Companions of the Order of Canada
Writers from Montreal
Governor General's Award-winning fiction writers
Governor General's Award-winning non-fiction writers
Deaths from cancer in Quebec
Deaths from kidney cancer
Anglophone Quebec people
Canadian people of Austrian-Jewish descent
Canadian people of Polish-Jewish descent
Canadian social commentators
Stephen Leacock Award winners
Sir George Williams University alumni
Montreal Gazette people
20th-century Canadian novelists
Canadian socialists
Canadian male screenwriters
Mordecai
20th-century Canadian screenwriters
21st-century Canadian screenwriters
Burials at Mount Royal Cemetery
Jewish Canadian journalists